The Dixon Hotel, in Tooley Street in the London borough of Southwark, is a former magistrates' court and police station designed by John Dixon Butler. Opened in 1906, it operated as a court until closure in 2013. Subsequently sold, it re-opened as The Dixon, in honour of the building's architect, and became a hotel operating as part of the Marriott International group. It is a Grade II listed building.

History and description
The architect John Dixon Butler (1860-1920) succeeded his father as Architect and Surveyor to the Metropolitan Police in 1895. Apprenticed to R. Norman Shaw, Dixon Butler worked under Shaw on the designs for New Scotland Yard (south building); the position being reversed at Canon Row Police Station where Butler was the lead architect and Shaw the assisting consultant. Dixon Butler went on to design over 200 public buildings, predominantly courts and police stations, across London. Historic England describes him as "one of the most accomplished Metropolitan Police architects". His architectural style was predominantly Baroque Revival and he was much influenced by Shaw.

The Dixon Hotel was designed as the Tower Bridge Police Court, latterly Tower Bridge Magistrates' Court and Police Station, in 1904 and opened in 1906. Built in stone and red brick laid in Flemish bond, the style is "Edwardian Baroque". The London: South Pevsner describes it as "quite spectacular of its date". It features doorcases with elaborate hoods, which became something of a Dixon Butler trademark. From the 1970s the Police Station at Tower Bridge was one of four bases for the Metropolitan Police’s Flying Squad, which specialised in responses to high-value armed robbery. The court closed in 2013 and was subsequently sold, re-opening as a hotel in 2019. The hotel's Courtroom Bar is located in the original magistrates' courtroom and a chandelier in the lobby is constructed from old handcuffs.
The original wood panelling remains, and the judge’s bench has also been transformed into a bar, which sits beneath the judge's original oak canopy

Notes

References

Sources

External links

  Tower Bridge Magistrates’ Court records held at the London Metropolitan Archive

Grade II listed buildings in the London Borough of Southwark
Hotels in London
Hotel buildings completed in 1906
Edwardian architecture in London